Jennifer Colón Alvarado (born December 21, 1987), also known as Jenny Allende, is a Puerto Rican  singer, Tv Personality, and former beauty queen who represented her country in Miss World 2009.

Early life
Colón was very creative as a child and had an early interest in music, science and art. Her grandfather, Eliseo Alvarado, was a well known musician in Orocovis, Puerto Rico. When she was 4 years old her brother was born with a rare disease called nonketotic hyperglycinemia. This and the flooding of their family home in San Juan made her parents move with her grandparents in Orocovis Puerto Rico for a few months. The sound of Colón's grandfather playing the cuatro (an instrument from Puerto Rico) left a mark in her heart and created a passion for sounds and melodies.

In 2005, she graduated with honors from high school Colegio Bautista in Levittown, Puerto Rico and  studied chemistry for three years (2005–2008) at Universidad Interamericana de Puerto Rico in Cupey.

In 2008, she changed her major to architecture, studying at the Polytechnic University of PR, but only for one year.

As a model, Colón appeared in many editorials and fashion shows in Puerto Rico and is one of the most sought after models on the island.

Pageant participation

Miss Teen of Puerto Rico 2006
At 16 years old, Colón participated in Miss Teen of PR 2006 with Natalia Rivera Piñero, where she placed 2nd runner-up.

Miss Puerto Rico Universe 2009
On October 22, 2008, Colón competed in the Miss Puerto Rico Universe 2009 competition representing San Juan municipality. She was considered a strong contender and was predicted by many to win the pageant. However, she placed 1st runner-up to Mayra Matos of Cabo Rojo. She also won the award for "Most Beautiful Hair".

Miss World Puerto Rico 2009
In early 2009, Colón decided to represent her hometown of Bayamón in the Miss World Puerto Rico 2009 pageant, held on July 23, 2009  in Puerto Rico.
 
Prior to the final competition, Colón won the Top Model fast-track event on July 9, which automatically guaranteed her a spot as a semi-finalist. Ivonne Orsini, who won the title of Miss World Puerto Rico 2008, would eventually crown Colón as Miss World Puerto Rico 2009.

Miss World 2009
Colón represented Puerto Rico at the Miss World 2009 pageant, held in Johannesburg, South Africa on December 12, 2009, where she was one of the semifinalists in the Miss World Sports and Miss World Beach Beauty fast-track events but did not advance to the semifinals in the final competition.

Personal life
Through people in Miss World Puerto Rico, she met Elan Allende, son of Fernando Allende. On September 21, 2010 Colón and Allende secretly wed in Puerto Rico with only relatives present. The couple's daughter Maria Valentina was born on June 21, 2011. On April 20, 2012 the couple welcomed their second child, son Fernando Jose. Together they form the Latin pop music duo called Shambayah. Previously both Elan and Jenny were cast members for the reality TV show on Bravo TV called Mexican Dynasties. The show was canceled after one season. As of May 2021, the couple has separated and filed for divorce. Jenny is currently engaged to actor Jairo Calero.

References

People from Bayamón, Puerto Rico
Puerto Rican people of Spanish descent
1987 births
Interamerican University of Puerto Rico alumni
Living people
Puerto Rican female models
Miss World 2009 delegates
Puerto Rican beauty pageant winners
Colón